Moritz Weber (1871–1951), was a professor of naval mechanics at the Polytechnic Institute of Berlin. The dimensionless numbers Reynolds number (named after the British scientist and mathematician Osborne Reynolds), and Froude number (named after the British engineer William Froude) was coined by Moritz Weber. Moreover, the dimensionless number Weber number was coined after him. Weber was also responsible in coining the term similitude to describe model studies that were scaled both geometrically and using dimensionless parameters for forces.

References

Academic staff of the Technical University of Berlin
1871 births
1951 deaths
Place of birth missing
Date of birth missing